also known as Ukibune Castle is the remains of a castle structure in Saito, Miyazaki Prefecture, Japan.

It is believed Tonokōri Castle was built by Itō Sukemochi in 1335 and became Itō clan's main bastion. After the Battle of Kizaki, the castle was controlled by the Shimazu clan.

Its ruins have been protected as a National Historic Site since 2000.

See also
List of Historic Sites of Japan (Miyazaki)

References

Castles in Miyazaki Prefecture
Historic Sites of Japan
Former castles in Japan
Shimazu clan
Ruined castles in Japan